Achaea lienardi, or Lienard's achaea, is a fruit piercing moth of the family Erebidae first described by Jean Baptiste Boisduval in 1833. It is found in most countries in tropical Africa from Egypt to South Africa, including the islands of Madagascar, Réunion and Mauritius. The larva may feed on various plants, belonging to the genera Maerua, Pappea, Rhus, Citrus, Schotia, Sideroxylon, Ptaeroxylon, Acacia, Allophylus, Croton, Pinus and Ricinus.

References

Achaea (moth)
Moths of Africa
Moths of the Comoros
Moths of Madagascar
Moths of Mauritius
Moths of Réunion
Moths of the Middle East
Moths described in 1833